Fort Washington Presbyterian Church, also known as Iglesia Presbiteriana Fort Washington Heights, is a historic Presbyterian church complex located in Washington Heights, New York, New York. The complex consists of a long rectangular three-by-seven-bay church with an attached Sunday school wing. It was designed by architect Thomas Hastings (1860–1929) and built between 1913 and 1914 in the Georgian Revival style. The church is a 2-story, plus basement, gable-roofed building with a monumental temple front elevation.  It features a prominent five stage bell tower.

The church was designated a New York City Landmark May 12, 2009. It was listed on the National Register of Historic Places in 2010.

References

External links
American Guild of Organists website

Properties of religious function on the National Register of Historic Places in Manhattan
Georgian Revival architecture in New York City
Churches completed in 1914
20th-century Presbyterian church buildings in the United States
Presbyterian churches in New York City
Churches in Manhattan
Washington Heights, Manhattan